Calathus giganteus is a species of ground beetle from the Platyninae subfamily that can be found in Albania and Greece.

References

giganteus
Beetles described in 1828
Beetles of Europe